= Fluorotriiodomethane =

Names
- Preferred IUPAC name Fluorotri(iodo)methane
- Other names Fluorotriiodomethane

Identifiers
CAS Number	1495-49-4
3D model (JSmol)	Interactive image
ChemSpider	11570071
PubChem CID	23510639
CompTox Dashboard (EPA)	DTXSID801032305
- InChI: InChI=1S/CFI3/c2-1(3,4)5 Key: GXKSSISYTXERRQ-UHFFFAOYSA-N
- SMILES: C(F)(I)(I)I

Properties
Chemical formula	CFI_{3}
Molar mass	411.723 g·mol^{−1}
- Except where otherwise noted, data are given for materials in their standard state (at 25 °C [77 °F], 100 kPa). Infobox references

Fluorotriiodomethane is a chemical compound and methane derivative with the chemical formula CFI_{3}.
